Helenium vernale is a North American species of flowering plant in the aster family known by the common name Savanna sneezeweed or spring sneezeweed. It is native to the southeastern United States, from Louisiana to the Carolinas.

One plant generally produces only 1–3 hemispherical flower heads, each on its own flower stalk. There are also 13–30 yellow ray flowers.

References

External links
Alabama Plants photo
Lady Bird Johnson Wildflower Center, University of Texas
Southeastern Flora

vernale
Flora of the Southeastern United States
Plants described in 1788
Flora without expected TNC conservation status